Julie Præst Wilche (born 1971 or 1972) is a Danish civil servant and diplomat. Since 2022, she serves as High Commissioner of Greenland.

Biography
Wilche trained as a nurse in Denmark before moving to Greenland in the early 1990s. In 2009, she graduated from the University of Greenland with a degree in administrative science. She then worked as a government official in the health department, most recently as acting head of department. In 2015, she was appointed head of department in the Ministry of Social Affairs and Justice. In September 2021, she replaced Minister-appointed Naaja Nathanielsen as Director of the Greenland Correctional Service. On 1 May 2022, she became the High Commissioner of Greenland, succeeeding Mikaela Engell.

Wilche has two children with her husband Jon Wilche (born 1957), who is the son of Danish carpenter Hugo Wilche (1919-?) and his Greenlandic wife Arnarsaq Bolethe Batseba Augusta Lynge (1926-?).

References

1972 births
Living people
High Commissioners of Greenland
21st-century Greenlandic politicians
Danish emigrants to Greenland
21st-century Danish women politicians
University of Greenland alumni
Greenlandic women in politics